Enrico Castelnuovo (February 12, 1839 – February 16, 1915) was an Italian writer who had an active role in the Italian unification movement.

He was the father of Guido Castelnuovo.

Literary works 
 Il quaderno della zia, 1872 ("Aunt's notebook")
 Nevica, 1878 ("It Snows")
 Reminiscenze e fantasie, 1885 ("Reminiscences and fantasies")
 Prima di partire, 1890 ("Before leaving")
 Il ritorno dell'Aretusa, 1901 ("The return of Arethusa")
 I coniugi Varedo, 1913 ("The couple Varedo")

External links 

 
 
 
  The complete text in Italian of "Il quaderno della zia"

Italian male writers
19th-century Italian Jews
1839 births
1915 deaths
20th-century Italian Jews